Eluphant (Hangul: 이루펀트) is a South Korean hip hop duo consisting of members Kebee and Minos. They debuted in 2006 with the album, Eluphant Bakery. They are currently signed to Brand New Music.

Discography

Studio albums

Extended plays

Single albums

Charted singles

As lead artist

Soundtrack appearances

References 

South Korean musical duos
Musical groups established in 2006
Brand New Music artists